35th Infantry Regiment (35e régiment d'infanterie) is an infantry regiment of the French Army. Its origins date back to the formation of the régiment de Nemond in 1604 by a member of the gentry from Lorraine whose surname was Némond. During World War I it was nicknamed As de Trèfle (Ace of Clubs). It is now based at the garrison in Belfort.

Notable figures who have served with the regiment or its predecessors include the brothers Louis and Auguste de Keralio (from 1734 to 1749), Étienne-Charles de Damas-Crux (second in command of the régiment d'Aquitaine on 3 October 1779), Maurice Chevalier (in 1913) and Jean Chrétien Fischer.

Lineage

Predecessors
 1604 : Creation of the régiment de Nemond
 1618 : régiment de la Force
 1661 : régiment de Durfort-Montgomery
 1665 : régiment de Durfort-Rauzan
 1670 : régiment Duc d'Anjou
 1671 : renamed the régiment d'Anjou
 1753 : renamed the régiment d'Aquitaine
 1776 : its 2nd and 4th battalions reformed the régiment d'Anjou

35th Infantry Regiment

Commanders (1964-present)

 1964 - Colonel Dufour
 1966 - Colonel Claude Vanbremeersch
 1968 - Colonel de Lavalette
 1969 - Colonel René Imbot
 1971 - Colonel Botella
 1973 - Colonel Poudelet
 1975 - Colonel Greyfié de Bellecombe
 1977 - Colonel Jeancolas
 1979 - Colonel Lacapelle
 1981 - Colonel Philippe Thérenty
 1983 - Colonel Philippe Mercier
 1985 - Colonel Maillols
 1987 - Colonel d'Ornano
 1989 - Colonel Kaeppelin
 1991 - Colonel Diot
 1993 - Colonel Pelissier 
 1995 - Colonel Barlet
 1997 - Colonel Boone
 1999 - Colonel de Foucault
 2001 - Colonel Egnell
 2003 - Colonel Duffour
 2005 - Colonel Dumain
 2007 - Colonel Duval
 2009 - Colonel Rondeau
 2011 - Colonel Bertrand Joret
 2013 - Colonel Ivan Martin
 2015 - Lieutenant Colonel Paul Bury
2017 - Colonel Christophe Richard
2019 - Colonel Jean Augier

Flags and uniforms

Present day activities
In January 2016, 124 soldiers from the regiment and a ceremonial military band contingent based in Lyon marched down Rajpath in New Delhi for the 67th Republic Day parade. On August 9, 2017, six soldiers from the 35th Infantry Regiment participating in Opération Sentinelle were wounded in Levallois-Perret in the Paris suburbs by an automobile whose driver had fled. The anti-terrorist section of Paris is seized of the investigation.

Battle honours

 1809 : Wagram
 1812 : Moskowa
 1830 : Alger
 1854 : Sébastopol
 1914 : Alsace l'Ourcq
 1915 : Champagne
 1916 : Verdun
 1918 : Reims
 1944 : Résistance Bourgogne
 1952-1962 : AFN

Symbols

Decorations

Croix de guerre 1914–1918 with four mentions in dispatches.

Heraldry

The insignia was created in 1952 and consists of a silver clover, with a bypassed link, placed on a terrace of the same, embellished with the number and the acronym regiment On the dextral slope, the inscription says "Tous gaillards". It symbolizes the courage of the soldiers of Belfort during the Franco-Prussian War.

Current status

Composition
Infantry Companies
 1er Compagnie - Mechanized infantry company
 2e Compagnie - Mechanized infantry company
 3e Compagnie - Mechanized infantry company
 4e Compagnie - Mechanized infantry company
 9e Compagnie - Mechanized infantry company
 Compagnie d'Appui - Support Company
 Section d'Appui Direct - Direct Support Section
 Section tireurs d'élite longue distance - Long Range Sniper Section
 Section d'aide à l'engagement débarqué - Landed Engagement Assistance Section
Support Companies
 Compagnie de commandement et de logistique - Command and logistical support company
 5e Compagnie de réserve - Reserve infantry company

Bibliography
Archives militaires du Château de Vincennes.
À partir du Recueil d'Historiques de l'Infanterie Française (Général Andolenko - Eurimprim 1969).
Lieutenant-colonel Bourdiaux, Histoire du 35e régiment d'infanterie
Pascal Collot, L'As de Trèfle sous les orages d'acier, Les Éditions comtoises, 2002,

References

External links
https://web.archive.org/web/20121125061914/http://www.ri35.terre.defense.gouv.fr/

Articles with empty sections from January 2013
All articles with empty sections
35
1604 establishments in France